Clarence Burgess Owens (born August 2, 1951) is an American politician, nonprofit executive and former professional football player serving as the U.S. representative for Utah's 4th congressional district since 2021. He played safety for 10 seasons for the New York Jets and the Oakland Raiders, winning a championship with the Raiders in Super Bowl XV in 1980. Since leaving the NFL, Owens has founded several businesses and is the CEO of a nonprofit dedicated to helping troubled and incarcerated youth. A Republican, Owens defeated incumbent Democrat Ben McAdams in the 2020 election. Owens is one of four black Republicans in the House of Representatives.

Early life 
Owens was born in Columbus, Ohio, where his Texas-born father had come to do graduate studies he could not complete in Texas due to Jim Crow laws. The family later moved to Tallahassee, Florida, where Owens's father taught as a college professor. Owens was raised in a Baptist home.

Education and football career 
Owens graduated from Rickards High School in Tallahassee, Florida, in 1969. He was one of four African-American players who were integrated onto a football team at a historically white high school. Owens was the third of four black athletes recruited to play at the University of Miami and the third black student to earn a scholarship. He was named a First-team All-American defensive back, Most Valuable Defensive Player of the North–South All Star Game, and MVP of the Coaches All-American Game. He was inducted into the University of Miami Sports Hall Of Fame in 1980, and its Orange Bowl "Ring of Honor" in 1999.

Owens earned a Bachelor of Science degree in Biology/Chemistry from the University of Miami.

The New York Jets selected Owens with the 13th pick in the first round of the 1973 NFL Draft. During his rookie season, he returned a kickoff 82 yards for a touchdown against the Denver Broncos. This was the Jets' only touchdown scored on a kickoff return during the 1970s. He was a regular starter for the Jets for most of the 1970s, and was a part of the Raiders' 1980 Super Bowl XV championship team.

Post-football career 
In 1983, Owens moved to New York City. Shortly after leaving professional football, he and his brother ran a business that sold electronics to other businesses to track business expenses. The venture failed and Owens eventually declared bankruptcy.

Owens later relocated to a small apartment in Brooklyn, where he worked as a chimney sweep and security guard. He later moved to Philadelphia, where he took a sales job with WordPerfect. In later years he was an account executive with Sprint and Motorola, and from 2009 to 2013 he owned a business called Pure and Simple Solutions.

He is a founder, board member, and CEO of Second Chance 4 Youth, founded in 2019, a nonprofit dedicated to helping troubled and incarcerated youth.

Owens has been a frequent guest contributor at Fox News.

U.S. House of Representatives

Elections

2020 

In November 2019, Owens announced that he would run for the U.S. House of Representatives in Utah's 4th congressional district. He was one of four candidates in the Republican primary.

On June 30, Owens won the primary with 43% of the vote, defeating Utah State Representative Kim Coleman by 20 points. He also defeated challengers KSL radio personality Jay McFarland and businessman Trent Christensen.

Owens was a speaker at the 2020 Republican National Convention.

Owens faced Democratic incumbent Ben McAdams in the general election. On November 14, eleven days after the election and with 99% of precincts reporting, President Donald Trump and Utah U.S. Senator Mike Lee congratulated Owens on winning the election, based upon Breitbart News calling it for Owens. McAdams conceded to Owens on November 16 and the Associated Press called the race for Owens.

Results

Tenure 
In late 2020, Owens was identified as a participant in the "Freedom Force", a group of incoming Republican members of the House of Representatives who oppose far-left ideology in the House, specifically the progressive group called "the Squad".

On January 6, 2021, during the certification of electoral votes for the 2020 United States presidential election, Owens opposed the objection to the electors from Arizona, but supported the objection to the electors from Pennsylvania.

In 2021, Owens opposed the For the People Act, a Democratic-sponsored bill to reform election laws.

In 2021, Owens co-sponsored the Fairness for All Act, the Republican alternative to the Equality Act. The bill would prohibit discrimination on the basis of sex, sexual orientation, and gender identity, and protect the free exercise of religion.

Committee assignments 

 Committee on Education and Labor
 Committee on the Judiciary

Caucus memberships 

Republican Study Committee

Political positions
Owens has said his views were liberal upon leaving the NFL in 1982. During his 2020 Republican primary campaign, he described his current views as "very conservative". In June 2019, Owens provided testimony to a United States House Committee on the Judiciary subcommittee opposing a bill that advocated reparations for slavery. He has also criticized U.S. national anthem protests and Colin Kaepernick. In November 2019, Owens called Donald Trump "an advocate for black Americans". On January 6, 2021, he voted to reject Pennsylvania's electoral votes for President-elect Biden but did not vote to reject Arizona's. At a June 1, 2020, Republican primary debate, Owens said Democrats in Washington are held in thrall by Marxists and socialists. He said, "The days of Ronald Reagan and Tip O'Neill are over. We're dealing with people who hate our country".

Healthcare
He said the Affordable Care Act should be repealed and that he supported President Trump. Later on in the campaign, Owens changed his stance, saying that coverage for preexisting conditions should be protected, and that he did not support repeal of Obamacare.

Economy
In a candidate forum in October 2020, Owens said the country's top economic need was to reduce business regulations and make tax cuts. He also stated his opposition to a minimum wage increase. When asked about the need for bipartisanship, he responded: The first thing we have to do is make sure that the Republican Party gets control again... We're at a point now we just cannot afford to go off the cliff and allow a socialist to actually take the lead now... We have to be honest about this. There are truly people who don't love our culture and do anything to destroy it and transform us into something else.

LGBT rights
On July 19, 2022, Owens was among 47 Republican representatives who voted in favor of the Respect for Marriage Act, which would codify the right to same-sex marriage in federal law. However, Owens voted "present" on final passage on December 8, 2022.

In August 2022, Owens co-sponsored a bill put forth by Marjorie Taylor Greene that would criminalize gender-affirming health care for trans youth.

Big Tech
In 2022, Owens was one of 39 Republicans to vote for the Merger Filing Fee Modernization Act of 2022, an antitrust package that would crack down on corporations for anti-competitive behavior.

Personal life
According to his website, Owens was married for 34 years and had six children before he and his wife divorced. He is a prostate cancer survivor.

Owens is a member of the Church of Jesus Christ of Latter-day Saints and has spoken publicly about his faith. He joined the Church during his final season with the Oakland Raiders. Crediting the influence of teammate Todd Christensen, Owens (raised Baptist), and his wife Josie (raised Catholic), were baptized on December 31, 1982. In 1988, he spoke at a meeting sponsored by the Charles Redd Center for Western Studies held on the 10th anniversary of the 1978 Revelation on Priesthood.

Works and publications
It's All About Team: Exposing the Black Talented Tenth, Paperless Publishing LLC, 2012.
 Liberalism or How to Turn Good Men into Whiners, Weenies and Wimps, Post Hill Press, 2016.
Why I Stand: From Freedom to the Killing Fields of Socialism, Post Hill Press, 2018.

See also
 Black conservatism in the United States
 List of African-American United States representatives
 List of American sportsperson-politicians

References

External links

 Representative Burgess Owens official U.S. House website
 Campaign website

|-

1951 births
21st-century American politicians
American athlete-politicians
American Latter Day Saints
African-American Latter Day Saints
African-American members of the United States House of Representatives
African-American people in Utah politics
African-American players of American football
American football safeties
Businesspeople from Utah
Black conservatism in the United States
Candidates in the 2020 United States elections
Critics of Black Lives Matter
Latter Day Saints from Ohio
Latter Day Saints from Utah
Living people
Los Angeles Raiders players
Miami Hurricanes football players
New York Jets players
Oakland Raiders players
Players of American football from Columbus, Ohio
Republican Party members of the United States House of Representatives from Utah
University of Miami alumni
Converts to Mormonism from Baptist denominations
21st-century African-American politicians
20th-century African-American sportspeople